Rijswijk, formerly known as Ryswick in English, is a city and municipality in the western Netherlands, in the province of South Holland.

The municipality also includes the former villages 't Haantje and Sion, currently also known as Rijswijk-Buiten.

Demographics
62% Dutch background, 
38% No Dutch background

History 

Archeological excavations indicate that this area of the coastal dunes was already inhabited some 5500 years ago. The formation of the village Rijswijk took place in the 13th century, and its history was dominated by presence of mansions and estates of the nobility and affluent. Among the many country estates known to have been in Rijswijk are:

 Arentsburg
 Burchvliet
 Cromvliet
 Den Burgh
 De Voorde
 Drievliet
 's-Gravenmade
 Haag- en Delftzicht
 Hilvoorde
 Hoekenburg
 Hofrust
 Hoornwijk
 Huis te Werve
 Huis ter Nieuwburg
 Leeuwendaal
 Oversteen
 Overvoorde
 Schoonoord
 Sion
 Steenvoorde
 Te Blotinghe
 Tollenshuis
 Vredenoord
 Welgelegen
 Zuidhoorn

The Treaty of Ryswick was signed at the Huis ter Nieuwburg in 1697, ending the Nine Years' War. A monument, the Needle of Rijswijk (1792), was erected to commemorate the treaty in the Rijswijk Forest.

Until 1900 Rijswijk remained a relative small community but it became urbanized during the 20th century when it expanded rapidly. Today, Rijswijk's area has almost been completely built-up. The last major development is the new Ypenburg neighbourhood, built on the lands of the former Ypenburg Airfield but this part of Rijswijk was annexed by The Hague in 2002. Rijswijk is part of the Haaglanden conurbation. During the years its built-up area has grown to the point where it has effectively merged with The Hague, even though it is still a separate municipality.

Up until 2009 Rijswijk had a polytechnic college for applied sciences; TH Rijswijk (Technische Hogeschool Rijswijk). After a merger with the Haagse Hogeschool, this was moved to the campus of the TUDelft in Delft. The building still remains.

Istana Negara, one of the six presidential palaces of Indonesia, in the Jakarta neighbourhood of Harmoni (formerly Rijswijk-Molenvliet), was called Palais te Rijswijk during Dutch colonial times.

Public transport
Rijswijk station
Stopplaats Rijswijk-Wateringen

Economy
Rijswijk is home to:
The Biomedical Primate Research Centre (BPRC).
The Netherlands Patent Office, at the same location as a branch of the European Patent Office.
A large technology centre of the oil company Shell, on Kessler Park.
A small part of the Dutch national Forensic Laboratory, researching clues and objects in order to aid police investigations. The main building is moved to The Hague-Ypenburg.
 The Headquarters of TUI Netherlands.

Recreation
Parks: Hoekpolder, Plaspoelpolder, Schaapweipolder, Hoge Broekpolder, Noordpolder, Park Overvoorde, Wilhelminapark, Elsenburgerbos, Park Steenvoorde.
Natural swimming location De Put
Rijswijkse Schouwburg, which hosts many national theatre shows.
The Von Fisenne Park has a petting zoo.
Sports park 'De Schilp' has an indoor swimming pool.
Museum Rijswijk located at Herenstraat 67, 2282 BR Rijswijk, which has many works of art

The largest shopping center is called 'In de Bogaard' and smaller shops are located in the old town center (Herenstraat). There is the old Schaapweimolen (windmill). De Broodfabriek holds many fairs and events.

Notable residents

Public thinking and public service 
 Dionysius Koolen (1871–1945) a Dutch politician
 Henk Beernink (1910 – 1979 in Rijswijk) a Dutch politician
 Chris van Veen (1922–2009) a politician; also worked for the municipality of Rijswijk 1945/1960
 Gerard Veringa (1924 – 1999 in Rijswijk) a Dutch politician and criminologist
 Maurits Kiek (1909-1980) resistance fighter World War II 
 Johan van Benthem (born 1949) former academic logician 
 Albert Benschop (1949-2018) a Dutch sociologist and academic
 Peter Oskam (born 1960) a Dutch politician, former football referee and judge
 Sigrid Kaag (born 1961) a Dutch politician and diplomat, Minister for Foreign Trade and Development since 2017
 Eelco Visser (1966-2022), professor of computer science

Arts 
 Adriaen van der Cabel (1630–1705) a Dutch Golden Age landscape painter
 Hendrik Tollens (1780 – 1856 in Rijswijk) poet
 P. J. Cosijn (1840–1899) a Dutch scholar of Anglo-Saxon literature
 Jacques van Meegeren (1912–1977) a Dutch illustrator, painter and suspected art forger
 Teddy Scholten (1926–2010) a Dutch singer and winner of the 1959 Eurovision Song Contest
 Felix Thijssen (born 1933) author of crime and science fiction novels and books for children
 Peter Slaghuis (1961–1991) a Dutch musician, DJ, producer and remixer 
 Ilja Leonard Pfeijffer (born 1968) a poet, novelist, polemicist and classical scholar

Sport 
 Louis Otten (1883–1946) football player, team bronze medallist at the 1908 Summer Olympics
 Piet van der Touw (born 1940) a retired cyclist, competed at the 1960 and 1964 Summer Olympics 
 Richard Knopper (born 1977) a Dutch former footballer with 285 club caps 
 Anish Giri (born 1994) a Russian-born Dutch chess Grandmaster, lives in Rijswijk
 Keye van der Vuurst de Vries (born 2001) a Dutch basketball player, made his debut for the Netherlands national basketball team aged 16
 Jeffrey de Zwaan (born 1996) Dutch darts player, born in Rijswijk
 Mark Caljouw (born 1995) Dutch badminton player, born in Rijswijk

References

External links 

Museum Rijswijk website

 
Municipalities of South Holland
Populated places in South Holland